Syed Shahenshah (1949–2017), was a notable Pashto-language actor and artist. He died at the age of 68.

Plays
He was notable for the following plays:
Sahar
Tasha Julai
Lambey
Swaal
Da Manzal pa Lore
Duwayem Noom
Azmaikht
Kagay Laray

References

1949 births
2017 deaths
Pakistani male film actors
Pashto cinema
People from Charsadda District, Pakistan
Pashtun people